Spearhead is a tank simulation / action video game developed by Zombie Studios and MAK Technologies, Inc., and published by Interactive Magic and Midas Interactive Entertainment for Microsoft Windows in 1998.

Development
The game was showcased at E3 1997.

Reception

Spearhead received mixed reviews according to the review aggregation website GameRankings.

The game was described as a mix between tank simulation and an action game. GameSpot said, "The game offers a handful of features and elements that seem ideal for hard-core sim fans, but the mission designs and the general feel of gameplay seem more appropriate for an action game than a serious sim." IGN said, "the emphasis here is definitely more on fun than it is on realism." PC Accelerator called it an "action/strategy/tank sim hybrid".

References

External links
 

1998 video games
Action video games
Tank simulation video games
Video games developed in the United States
Windows games
Windows-only games
Zombie Studios games